Classical Greek Tactics: A Cultural History is a 2017 non-fiction book by Dutch historian Roel Konijnendijk, published by Brill Publishers.

Synopsis
The book re-assesses ancient Greek warfare by examining literary evidence from the 5th and 4th Century BCE. It also re-examines Western scholarship on the topic from the 19th Century onwards. Konijnendijk rejects theories that the Greeks primarily engaged in ritualized warfare on a limited scale. Instead, he proposes that Greek warfare was brutal and destructive, and that Greek battle tactics were not as primitive as some modern scholars have claimed.

Reception
Upon publication, it garnered a mostly positive reception. Kyle Fingerson, writing for Bryn Mawr Classical Review, called it "a much-needed reevaluation of the traditional views of classical Greek warfare," and recommended that it be used in future studies of the subject. It received similar praise from Kostas Vlassopoulos in Greece & Rome, and Pavel Nývlt in Eirene: Studia Graeca et Latina. In a review for The Classical Journal, Edith Foster praised the book's examination of Classical scholarship, saying that it was "clear and well-organized".

References 

2017 non-fiction books
Brill Publishers books
Non-fiction books about war
History books about ancient Greece
History books about the Greco-Persian Wars
Books about military history